North Seymour is a small island near Baltra Island in the Galápagos Islands. It was formed by uplift of a submarine lava formation. The whole island is covered with low, bushy vegetation.

The island is named after an English nobleman, Lord Hugh Seymour. This island is home to a large population of blue-footed boobies and swallow-tailed gulls. It hosts one of the largest populations of magnificent frigatebirds (Fregata magnificens) and a slowly growing population of Galápagos land iguanas (Conolophus subcristatus).

The stock for the captive breeding program of the Galápagos land iguana is descended from iguanas which Captain G. Allan Hancock translocated from nearby Baltra Island to North Seymour Island in the 1930s.  This was very important because Baltra Island had a U.S airbase on it during World War II, while North Seymour, which has no people who live on it, and is only viewable today with an official guide who works for the Galápagos National Park.

North Seymour was created by seismic uplift, rather than being of volcanic origin. The island has a flat profile with cliffs only a few meters from the shoreline, where swallowtail gulls and tropicbirds sit perched in ledges. A tiny forest of silver-grey Palo Santo trees stand just above the landing, usually without leaves, waiting for rain to bring them into bloom. The island is teeming with life. While visiting the island, one may have to give way to a passing sea lion or marine iguana. Flocks of pelicans and swallow-tailed gulls feed off shore, and seasonally, Nazca boobies can also be seen.
North Seymour is an extraordinary place for breeding birds, and is home to one of the largest populations of nesting blue-footed boobies and magnificent frigate birds. Pairs of blue-footed boobies can be seen conducting their mating ritual as they offer each other gifts, whistle and honk, stretch their necks towards the sky, spread their wings, and dance—showing off their bright blue feet. Magnificent frigatebirds perch in low bushes, near the boobies, while watching over their large chicks. The frigates are huge, dark aerobats with a  wingspan. Male frigates can puff up their scarlet throat sacks to resemble giant red balloons. Boobies and frigates have an interesting relationship. Boobies are excellent hunters and fish in flocks. The frigates by comparison are pirates, they dive bomb the boobies to force them to drop their prey. Then, the aerobatic frigate swoops down and picks up the food before it hits the water.

Conservation and Restoration
The Directorate of Galápagos National Park and Island Conservation reintroduced 1,436 Galápagos land iguanas (Conolophus subcristatus) to Santiago Island  on 4 January 2019 after a 180 year absence. The partners reintroduced the land iguanas in an effort to restore that island’s ecological health and to provide the opportunity for this iguana species to thrive. Land iguanas were sourced from North Seymour Island, where they were introduced in the 1930s and have increased to over 5,000 and faced a lack of food availability. Charles Darwin was the second-last person to record land iguanas alive on Santiago Island in 1835, with Abel-Nicolas Bergasse du Petit-Thouars being the last in 1838. 

On January 12, 2019, The Directorate of Galápagos National Park and Island Conservation used drones to eradicate invasive rats from the island - this is the first time such an approach has been used on vertebrates in the wild. The operation aims to remove black rats (Rattus rattus) and brown rats (Rattus norvegicus) which are negatively impacting native species. The expectation is that this innovation will pave the way for cheaper invasive species eradications in the future on small and mid-sized islands.

Additional images

References

External links

 North Seymour Information
 North Seymour Land Iguana History

Islands of the Galápagos Islands
Island restoration